{{DISPLAYTITLE:SrCO3}}
The molecular formula SrCO3 (molar mass: 147.63 g/mol, exact mass: 147.8904 u) may refer to:

 Strontianite
 Strontium carbonate